Nila is an extinct Austronesian language originally spoken on Nila Island in Maluku, Indonesia. Speakers were relocated to Seram due to volcanic activity on Nila.

References 

Languages of Indonesia
Timor–Babar languages